Horst Franz (born 17 June 1940) is a German football manager. His son Sascha Franz is also a football coach.

He began his coaching career in Austria.

References

1940 births
Living people
German football managers
Karlsruher SC managers
Arminia Bielefeld managers
Borussia Dortmund managers
FC Schalke 04 managers
Bundesliga managers
1. FSV Mainz 05 managers
Rot-Weiss Essen managers
FC Linz managers
First Vienna FC managers
West German football managers
West German expatriate football managers
Expatriate football managers in Austria
West German expatriate sportspeople in Austria